Antioch Baptist Church is a Gothic Revival-style church located at 4213 N. Market St. in St. Louis, Missouri.  It was added to the National Register of Historic Places in 1999.

References

Churches on the National Register of Historic Places in Missouri
Churches in St. Louis
Baptist churches in Missouri
National Register of Historic Places in St. Louis